Alende is a surname. Notable people with the surname include:

Claudia Alende (born 1995), Brazilian singer, model, and businesswoman
Diego Alende (born 1997), Spanish footballer
Oscar Alende (1909–1996), Argentine politician

See also
Allende (surname)